David Blake (born 23 April 1971) is a New Zealand cricketer. He played in 19 first-class and 46 List A matches for Central Districts and Northern Districts from 1992 to 1999.

References

External links
 

1971 births
Living people
New Zealand cricketers
Central Districts cricketers
Northern Districts cricketers
Cricketers from Auckland